Melwood is a 0.6 hectare Local Nature Reserve in Meldreth in Cambridgeshire, England. It is owned by Cambridgeshire County Council and managed by the Melwood Conservation Group.

This is a woodland site next to the River Mel, with trees such as ash, hawthorn, sycamore, beech and silver birch. Ground flora include dog violet and cow parsley, while traveller's joy provides food for moths. Tawny owls and pipistrelle bats roost on ivy.

There is access by a footpath from Flambards Close.

References

External links
Melwood Conservation Group website

Local Nature Reserves in Cambridgeshire